The Hindu Yuva Vahini was a Hindu youth religious  group, incorporated by Yogi Adityanath, intended successor of the Gorakhpur Mutt temple in Gorakhpur, India. The group was founded in April 2002, on the day of Rama Navami by Yogi Adityanath.

Description 
Hindu Yuva Vahini (HYV) describes itself as "A fierce cultural and social organisation dedicated to Hindutva and nationalism". Its stated objectives are: "the integration of and mutual good faith within the massive Hindu society, through the complete abolishment of the differentiation between touchable-untouchable and high-low, promote the harmonious development of society." However cow protection, fighting against Love Jihad and performing Ghar Wapsi are said, per media reports, to have been top priority on the Hindu Yuva Vahini's agenda.

References

Further reading

External links 
 What is Yogi Adityanath’s Hindu Yuva Vahini? Indian Express; May 17, 2017.
 Hindu Yuva Vahini Ready to Hit National Highway Economic Times; March 20, 2017.
 Inside Yogi's Hindu Yuva Vahini rediff.com; April 18, 2017.

Hindutva
Far-right politics in India
Hindu organizations
Yogi Adityanath
2002 establishments in Uttar Pradesh
Religious organizations established in 2002